is a subprefecture of Hokkaido Prefecture, Japan located on the Oshima Peninsula on the Sea of Japan side. It includes Okushiri Island. It was established in 1897.

Geography

Mergers

History
1897: Hiyama Subprefecture was established.
2005: Kumaishi Town (Nishi District) was merged with Yakumo Town (Yamakoshi District, Oshima Subprefecture) and transferred to Oshima Subprefecture. At the same time, Hiyama Subprefecture was divided between north and south.
2014: Esashi Line (from Kikonai Station to Esashi Station) was abolished. Therefore, Hiyama Subprefecture became the only subprefecture in which there is no railway.

External links

Official Website 

Subprefectures in Hokkaido